Fulya Kantarcıoğlu (born 17 February 1948) is a Turkish female jurist. She was a member of supreme courts.

Private life
Fulya Kantarcıoğlu was boırn in Ankara, Turkey on 17 February 1948. After finishing her primary and high school education, she graduated from the School of Law of Ankara University in 1969. She is married and mother of two.

Career
She started to serve at the Council of State of Turkey on 27 October 1970. On 7 March 1973, she was assigned as a reporter at the Constitutional Court of Turkey. On 27 February 1992, she was appointed the Vice Undersecretary of the Ministry of Justice. On 20 October 1994 she was elected to the  Council of State as a member. On 19 December 1995, she was appointed by the President Süleyman Demirel to the membership of the Constitutional Court. She retired on 17 February 2013.

References

Living people
1948 births
People from Ankara
Turkish jurists
Turkish women civil servants
Turkish civil servants
Members of the Council of State (Turkey)